Curtiss Cook is an American character actor from Dayton, Ohio. He studied at the Mountview Academy of Theatre Arts in London. As a teenager, he danced with the Dayton Contemporary Dance Company.

After college, Cook moved to New York, and appeared on Broadway in The Lion King and Miss Saigon. He has appeared in the films The Interpreter (2005) and Arbitrage (2012), and the television series House of Cards, Manifest, Mayans M.C., Luke Cage, Narcos and The Chi, among others. He plays Abe in the Steven Spielberg film adaptation of West Side Story.

References

External links

Stage credits

20th-century American male actors
21st-century American male actors
African-American male actors
American male film actors
American male television actors
American male stage actors
Living people
Male actors from Ohio
Year of birth missing (living people)
20th-century African-American people
21st-century African-American people